The 1987 Austrian Supercup was a football match that saw the 1986–87 Bundesliga and 1986–87 Austrian Cup champions Rapid Wien face off against 1986-87 Austrian Cup finalists Swarovski Tirol. The match was held on 18 July 1987 at the Gerhard Hanappi Stadium in Vienna. Rapid Wien defended their title that they won in the 1986 Austrian Supercup.

Match details

See also
1986–87 Austrian Football Bundesliga
1986–87 Austrian Cup

Austrian Supercup